Stephen Ivan Portman (born 1 January 1935 in Mount Vernon, New York) is an American conductor and pianist, educated also in Italy and Finland.

Portman studied the piano with Paul Wittgenstein in New York, in Rome at the Academy of St. Cecilia with Carlo Zecchi and then at Juilliard School with Sascha Gorodnitzki in the 1950s, and conducting at Mannes School of Music. He studied with Pierre Monteux and subsequently on a fellowship with George Szell and the Cleveland Orchestra. He moved to Finland and continued his studies at the Sibelius Academy with conductor Jussi Jalas in 1962–1964.

He held the post of Musical Director of the Opera Studio at the Sibelius Academy between 1965-1970 and then Conductor at the Finnish National Opera in 1969–1970, and at Oulu Symphony Orchestra 1970–1975. After which, he conducted opera in Gothenburg and Malmö among others. He's also conducted in Italy, Denmark, USSR, Czechoslovakia, South Africa and the USA.

In 1977, he moved the England and has conducted the BBC Singers and the Royal Philharmonic Orchestra with Birgit Nilsson at The Proms.

He retired from active conducting in 1985.

Sources
 Otavan Iso Musiikkitietosanakirja 4, pp. 624–625. Helsinki 1978.  

1935 births
American male conductors (music)
Musicians from Mount Vernon, New York
Living people
20th-century American pianists
American expatriates in Finland
American male pianists
Classical musicians from New York (state)
20th-century American conductors (music)
21st-century American pianists
20th-century American male musicians
21st-century American male musicians